Blood Music may refer to:
 Blood Music (novel), a 1985 science fiction novel by Greg Bear
 Blood Music (Chapterhouse album)
 Blood Music (Dead Celebrity Status album)